Elvis Presley – The Greensboro Concert 1972 is a concert performance by Elvis Presley on April 14, 1972 in Greensboro Coliseum located in Greensboro, North Carolina. Footage from this show was used in the Golden Globe-winning Elvis on Tour 1972 movie. Elvis wore Blue Owl suit for this show.

Track list
Elvis played the following tracks:
A Space Odyssey
See See Rider
Proud Mary
Never Been to Spain
You Gave Me a Mountain
Until It's Time for You to Go
Polk Salad Annie
Love Me
All Shook Up
Teddy Bear/Don't Be Cruel
Hound Dog
Heartbreak Hotel
A Big Hunk O' Love
Bridge Over Troubled Water
Suspicious Minds
Love Me Tender
(band introductions)
For the Good Times
An American Trilogy
Burning Love
Release Me
Funny How Time Slips Away
Can't Help Falling In Love

References

1972 in music
Elvis Presley
Events in Greensboro, North Carolina